Charles V. Blanchard (February 2, 1866 – February 20, 1939) was an American politician who served as a Massachusetts State Representative and as a Massachusetts State Senator.

While he was a member of the Massachusetts House Blanchard developed a close friendship with Calvin Coolidge.  Blanchard, it was rumored, taught Coolidge how to properly dress for various occasions.

Blanchard did not seek reëlection to the senate in 1913.  Blanchard was replaced by Charles W. Eldridge for the 1914 legislative term.

Blanchard worked for many years for the N. E. Tel & Tel Co.

Blanchard had a heart attack and died while he was on a trip to Florida, where he had gone to spend the winter.

See also
 131st Massachusetts General Court (1910)
 134th Massachusetts General Court (1913)

Notes

1866 births
1939 deaths
Republican Party members of the Massachusetts House of Representatives
Republican Party Massachusetts state senators
Politicians from Cambridge, Massachusetts